The 1999 Catalan regional election was held on Sunday, 17 October 1999, to elect the 6th Parliament of the autonomous community of Catalonia. All 135 seats in the Parliament were up for election.

The election saw the Socialists' Party of Catalonia (PSC) under former Mayor of Barcelona Pasqual Maragall achieve a razor-thin victory in the popular vote, the first time since 1980 that the Convergence and Union (CiU) alliance of incumbent president Jordi Pujol did not come out in top of voters' preferences. However, as a result of the electoral system, CiU was able to retain first place in terms of seats, and together with the conservative People's Party (PP), secure a small majority of 68 seats in the Parliament of Catalonia, compared to the 67 garnered by the combined total of all three left-from-centre parties: the PSC, Republican Left of Catalonia (ERC) and Initiative for Catalonia–Greens (IC–V). The latter had recently split from its national referent, United Left (IU), which ahead of the election established a new regional branch, United and Alternative Left (EUiA), which failed to secure any parliamentary representation.

Overview

Electoral system
The Parliament of Catalonia was the devolved, unicameral legislature of the autonomous community of Catalonia, having legislative power in regional matters as defined by the Spanish Constitution of 1978 and the regional Statute of Autonomy, as well as the ability to vote confidence in or withdraw it from a regional president.

Transitory Provision Fourth of the Statute established a specific electoral procedure for elections to the Parliament of Catalonia, of application for as long as a specific law regulating the procedures for regional elections was not approved, to be supplemented by the provisions within the Organic Law of General Electoral Regime. Voting for the Parliament was on the basis of universal suffrage, which comprised all nationals over 18 years of age, registered in Catalonia and in full enjoyment of their political rights. The 135 members of the Parliament of Catalonia were elected using the D'Hondt method and a closed list proportional representation, with an electoral threshold of three percent of valid votes—which included blank ballots—being applied in each constituency. Seats were allocated to constituencies, corresponding to the provinces of Barcelona, Girona, Lleida and Tarragona, with each being allocated a fixed number of seats.

The use of the D'Hondt method might result in a higher effective threshold, depending on the district magnitude.

Election date
The term of the Parliament of Catalonia expired four years after the date of its previous election, unless it was dissolved earlier. The regional president was required to call an election fifteen days prior to the date of expiry of parliament, with election day taking place within sixty days after the call. The previous election was held on 19 November 1995, which meant that the legislature's term would have expired on 19 November 1999. The election was required to be called no later than 4 November 1999, with it taking place on the sixtieth day from the call, setting the latest possible election date for the Parliament on Monday, 3 January 2000.

The president had the prerogative to dissolve the Parliament of Catalonia and call a snap election, provided that no motion of no confidence was in process and that dissolution did not occur before one year had elapsed since a previous one under this procedure. In the event of an investiture process failing to elect a regional President within a two-month period from the first ballot, the Parliament was to be automatically dissolved and a fresh election called.

Parties and candidates
The electoral law allowed for parties and federations registered in the interior ministry, coalitions and groupings of electors to present lists of candidates. Parties and federations intending to form a coalition ahead of an election were required to inform the relevant Electoral Commission within ten days of the election call, whereas groupings of electors needed to secure the signature of at least one percent of the electorate in the constituencies for which they sought election, disallowing electors from signing for more than one list of candidates.

Below is a list of the main parties and electoral alliances which contested the election:

Opinion polls
The tables below list opinion polling results in reverse chronological order, showing the most recent first and using the dates when the survey fieldwork was done, as opposed to the date of publication. Where the fieldwork dates are unknown, the date of publication is given instead. The highest percentage figure in each polling survey is displayed with its background shaded in the leading party's colour. If a tie ensues, this is applied to the figures with the highest percentages. The "Lead" column on the right shows the percentage-point difference between the parties with the highest percentages in a poll.

Graphical summary

Voting intention estimates
The table below lists weighted voting intention estimates. Refusals are generally excluded from the party vote percentages, while question wording and the treatment of "don't know" responses and those not intending to vote may vary between polling organisations. When available, seat projections determined by the polling organisations are displayed below (or in place of) the percentages in a smaller font; 68 seats were required for an absolute majority in the Parliament of Catalonia.

Results

Overall

Distribution by constituency

Aftermath

Government formation

2001 motion of no confidence

Notes

References
Opinion poll sources

Other

Catalonia
Regional elections in Catalonia
1999 in Catalonia
October 1999 events in Europe